Jamie Bennett may refer to:

 Jamie Bennett (businessman) (born 1971), Scottish entrepreneur
 Jamie Bennett (artist) (born 1948), American artist and educator

See also 
 James Bennett (disambiguation)